Meitei festivals are an integral part of the cultural heritage of the Meitei people, an ethnic group native to the Indian state of Manipur. The festivals often celebrate events from Ancient Manipur and often coinciding with seasonal changes. These festivals reflect the unique customs and traditions of the Meitei community, and are celebrated with great enthusiasm and zeal. There are various festivals celebrated throughout the year, each with its own significance and rituals.

List

Cheiraoba 

Cheiraoba (ꯆꯩꯔꯥꯎꯕ), the new year festival of the Meitei ethnicity falls on the 1st lunar day of Sajibu month in the Meitei year. During the celebration, people worship Lainingthou Sanamahi inside the Sanamahi Kachin, by offering fruits and vegetables available during the season of the year.

Emoinu Eratpa 

Emoinu Eratpa (ꯏꯃꯣꯢꯅꯨ ꯏꯔꯥꯠꯄ), the sacred day for Emoinu, the goddess of wealth and prosperity in Meitei mythology and religion, falls on the 12th lunar day of the Wakching month of the Meitei year.

The festival falls on the twelfth lunar day of Wakching month of Meitei calendar.

The festival is celebrated in Manipur, Assam, Tripura in India and Bangladesh as well as Myanmar.

Heikru Hidongba 

Heikru Hidongba (ꯍꯩꯀ꯭ꯔꯨ ꯍꯤꯗꯣꯡꯕ), the annual royal boat racing festive event (a typical Hiyang Tannaba), falls on the 11th lunar day of the Langban month of the Meitei year. The event is mainly organized in the moat of the Sagolband Bijoy Gobinda in Imphal.

It is a socio-religious ceremony performed every year at the moat of the Sagolband Bijoy Govinda Leikai, Imphal on the 11th day of the Meitei calendar month Langban (coinciding with September) with elements of religious, custom and other traditional belief of creation.

Kwaak Taanba 

Kwaak Taanba (ꯀ꯭ꯋꯥꯛ ꯇꯥꯟꯕ), the ceremonial freeing of the crow by the Meitei king, falls on the 10th lunar day of the Mera month of the Meitei year. Its main venue for celebration is the Sana Konung, the Royal Residence of the King of Manipur.

The day falls on the 10th lunar day of Mera month of the Meitei calendar. The festival accompanies several rites and rituals, along with various divine dance and music performances held at the Sana Konung, the Royal Palace of Manipur at Imphal..

The setting free of the crow is performed at the Thangapat, the Royal Moat, in Imphal. The main purpose of the festival is to bring prosperity and good luck in the region. It's performed since time immemorial.

Lai Haraoba 

Lai Haraoba (ꯂꯥꯢ ꯍꯔꯥꯎꯕ), the merrymaking festival dedicated to the Umang Lais and the Lam Lais of Sanamahism, has no particular dates of celebration according to Meitei calendar. Some are celebrated for a few weeks while some continue for more than a month.

Translated, Lai Haraoba means merry making of the Gods in Meiteilon.

This festival is organized as a piece of memory of the contribution of Gods in creating the Universe and also it is celebrated in the memory of the development of plants, animals and human beings.

Mera Chaorel Houba 

Mera Chaorel Houba (ꯃꯦꯔꯥ ꯆꯥꯎꯔꯦꯜ ꯍꯧꯕ), the onset of the Mera month is marked by the united gatherings of the Meitei people along with the tribesmen communities of Manipur on the 1st lunar day of the Mera month of the Meitei year. It is during this event that devotees offer rice, fruits and vegetables to Lainingthou Sanamahi and Leimarel Sidabi in the sacred Sanamahi Temple of Imphal.

Mera Hou Chongba 

Mera Hou Chongba (ꯃꯦꯔꯥ ꯍꯧ ꯆꯣꯡꯕ) falls on the 15th lunar day of the Mera month of the Meitei year. Its main theme is the unity and love between the Meitei people and the tribesmen communities of Manipur.

On this day, all the hill tribes came down to the valley of Imphal, and gather at the Royal Palace, and show their cultural dances and other art forms. The day ends with a grand feast, held together with the Meitei people and the tribes, to show solitude, oness of all the ethnic groups in the region.

Ningol Chakouba 

Ningol Chakouba (ꯅꯤꯉꯣꯜ ꯆꯥꯛꯀꯧꯕ) falls on the 2nd lunar day of the Hiyangkei month of the Meitei year. It is on this day that the married ladies compulsory visit their parental house to dine with their paternal family members, especially brothers.

The festival is celebrated in the theme of strengthening of the bond of love between married ladies (ningol) and their paternal families.

Panthoibi Iratpa 

Panthoibi Iratpa (ꯄꯥꯟꯊꯣꯢꯕꯤ ꯏꯔꯥꯠꯄ), the sacred festival dedicated to Panthoipi, the Meitei goddess of war and love, is celebrated by her devotees, in the holy pantheons dedicated to her.

The festival falls on the same day of Hindu festival of Durga Puja. So, both the festival are celebrated together in Manipur.  The goddess Panthoibi is also worshipped as the goddess of same attributes (riding on the tiger) with that of Hindu goddess Durga since 1714 AD during the reign of Emperor Garib Niwaj when he embraced Hinduism as the official religion in the kingdom of Manipur.

The Hiyangthang Lairembi Temple in Imphal West district is the largest site for the festival in Manipur.

Sanamahi Ahong Khong Chingba 

Sanamahi Ahong Khong Chingba (ꯁꯅꯥꯃꯍꯤ ꯑꯍꯣꯡ ꯈꯣꯡ ꯆꯤꯡꯕ), also known as Sanamahi Cheng Hongba, is a grand chariot pulling festival dedicated to Sanamahi, the Guardian of the mankind in Sanamahism. It is on this day people pour a basketful of uncooked rice in front of the idol of the deity. The main venue of the event is Imphal. It was revived in 2018 AD after having been banned for 350 years.                      

The Imphal city serves as the main location of the festival. It attracts thousands of pilgrims who join the procession. The festival was celebrated 350 years ago, and after a long pause, it was first recelebrated in the year 2018.

Yaoshang 

 (ꯌꯥꯎꯁꯪ) falls on the 15th lunar day of the Lamtaa month of the Meitei year. It is a five-day festival, starting from the Full moon day of the month. Due to its coincidence with the timing of Holi, people imitate the Hindu culture of using colors to spray among one another. Yaosang is indigenous traditions of the Meitei people. It is considered the most important festival in Manipur.

Other festivals 

Since some sections of Meitei people also follow Hinduism and Christianity, the general Hindu and Christian festivals are also celebrated in addition to those of the traditional Meitei religion (Sanamahism).

See Also 

 Meitei culture
 Ancient Kangleipak
 Meitei language
 Christianity in Manipur
 Hinduism in Manipur
 Hindu festival

References 

Manipur
Meitei culture
Festivals by culture
Pages with unreviewed translations